is a Japanese monthly seinen manga magazine published by Shogakukan. It originally launched on August 27, 2009. It is a companion magazine to the weekly Big Comic Spirits.

Series

Current
There are currently 15 manga series being serialized in Monthly Big Comic Spirits.

Finished

2009
 by Yumi Unita (August 2009–January 2014)
 by Kayoko Shimotsuki (August 2009–May 2010) (transferred from Weekly Big Comic Spirits)
 by Hideo Shinaogawa (August 2009–September 2011)
 by Taishi Mori (August 2009–July 2013)
 by Kazunori Tahara (August 2009–July 2013)
 by Munehiro Nomura (August 2009–December 2011)
 by Jun Hanyunyu (August 2009–January 2011)
 by Pero Sugimoto (August 2009–November 2010)
 by Riichi Kasai (August 2009–October 2010)
 by Katsura Murakami (August 2009–July 2011)
 by Yūji Takemoto (September 2009–September 2013)
 by Keigo Shinzou (September 2009–July 2010)
 by Masaki Satō (September 2009–January 2011)
 by Natsuo Motomachi (November 2009–September 2010)
 by Yukiko Gotō (November 2009–June 2010) (transferred to Weekly Big Comic Spirits; another chapter was published in MBCS in September 2010)

2010–2014
 by Yukiwo Katayama and Momoji Higashi (cooperation) (January 2010–December 2011) (transferred to Weekly Big Comic Spirits)
 by Takeshi Natsuhara (story; as Hideki Gō) and Yū Takada (art) (April 2010–December 2011)
Dragon Jam by Itsunari Fuji (May 2010–January 2011) (transferred to Weekly Big Comic Spirits)
 by Yu Itō (July 2010–March 2017)
 by Shun Umezawa (October 2010–February 2012)
 by Masato Fujisaki (October 2010–January 2011) (transferred from Weekly Big Comic Spirits)
 by Sanko Takada (December 2010–November 2013)
 by Satoshi Yoshida (February 2011–March 2013) (transferred from Weekly Big Comic Spirits)
 by Yū Sanui (story) and 	Sumihito Itami (art) (January 2012–June 2017)
 by Makoto Ogino (March 2012–July 2019)
 by Masami Yuki (April 2013–October 2017)
 by Masaki Enjoji (January 2014–October 2015)
 by Akane Tamura (April 2014–June 2015)
 by Mari Okazaki (May 2014–May 2021)
 by Jun Mayuzuki (June 2014–November 2015) (transferred to Weekly Big Comic Spirits)
 by Ryo Ikuemi (August 2014–April 2022)
 by Yumi Unita (October 2014–February 2021)
 by Minoru Takeyoshi (December 2014–October 2017)

2015–2019
Sunny by Taiyō Matsumoto (January–July 2015) (transferred from Monthly Ikki)
 by Keigo Shinzō (June 2015–January 2017)
 by Kyo Yoneshiro (August 2015–February 2018)
 by Arata Kawabata (January 2016–October 2017)
 by Aako Fujiwara (March 2017–November 2020)
 by Masami Yuki (January 2018–October 2019) (transferred to Weekly Big Comic Spirits)
 by Shizuka Itō (May 2018–June 2019)
 by Takashi Wada (December 2018–August 2020)
 by Kenji Hayakawa (March 2019–April 2021)
 by Kenichiro Nagao (January 2019–August 2022)
 by Midori Mizutani (June 2019–September 2022)

2020–present
 by Midori Machida (June 2020–December 2021)
 by Ikkado Itoh (July 2020–September 2021)
 by Ukitsu (August 2020–July 2022)
 by Erika Miura (August 2020–August 2022)
 by Aoi Sekino (December 2020–August 2022)
Yasuke by Satoshi Okunishi (July 2021–July 2022)
 by Mashimi Mori (August 2021–September 2022)
 by Haru Akiyama (December 2021–December 2022)

References

External links
 

2009 establishments in Japan
Monthly manga magazines published in Japan
Magazines established in 2009
Seinen manga magazines
Shogakukan magazines
Magazines published in Tokyo